Bala Mahalleh-ye Siah Belash (also Romanized as Bālā Maḩalleh-ye Sīāh Belāsh; also known as Sīāh Belāsh) is a village in Gil Dulab Rural District, in the Central District of Rezvanshahr County, Gilan Province, Iran. At the 2006 census, its population was 53, in 14 families.

References 

Populated places in Rezvanshahr County